All-trans-nonaprenyl-diphosphate synthase (geranyl-diphosphate specific) (nonaprenyl diphosphate synthase, solanesyl diphosphate synthase, SolPP synthase, SPP-synthase, SPP synthase, solanesyl-diphosphate synthase, OsSPS2) is an enzyme with systematic name geranyl-diphosphate:isopentenyl-diphosphate transtransferase (adding 7 isopentenyl units). This enzyme catalyses the following chemical reaction

 geranyl diphosphate + 7 isopentenyl diphosphate  7 diphosphate + all-trans-nonaprenyl diphosphate

This enzyme is involved in the synthesis of the side chain of menaquinone-9.

References

External links 

EC 2.5.1